Chemistry may refer to several publications

Chemistry (MDPI journal), published by MDPI
Chemistry: A European Journal, published by Wiley-VCH on behalf of Chemistry Europe
Chemistry: An Asian Journal, published by Wiley-VCH on behalf of ChemPubSoc Europe

See also 
Chem (journal), published by Cell Press